Ken Ono (born March 20, 1968) is an American mathematician who specializes in number theory, especially in integer partitions, modular forms,  umbral moonshine, the Riemann Hypothesis and the fields of interest to Srinivasa Ramanujan. He is the STEM Advisor to the Provost and the Marvin Rosenblum Professor of Mathematics at the University of Virginia.

Early life and education
Ono was born on March 20, 1968 in Philadelphia, Pennsylvania. He is the son of mathematician Takashi Ono, who emigrated from Japan to the United States after World War II. His older brother, immunologist and university president Santa J. Ono, was born while Takashi Ono was in Canada working at the University of British Columbia, but by the time Ken Ono was born the family had returned to the US for a position at the University of Pennsylvania. In the 1980s, Ono attended Towson High School, but he dropped out.  He later enrolled at the University of Chicago without a high school diploma. There he raced bicycles, and he was a member of the Pepsi–Miyata Cycling Team.

He received his BA from the University of Chicago in 1989, where he was a member of the Psi Upsilon fraternity. He earned his PhD in 1993 at UCLA where his advisor was Basil Gordon. Initially he planned to study medicine, but later switched to mathematics. He attributes his interest in mathematics to his father.

Career
Ono worked as an instructor at Woodbury University from 1991 to 1993, as a visiting assistant professor at the University of Georgia from 1993 to 1994, and as a visiting assistant professor at the University of Illinois at Urbana-Champaign from 1994 to 1995. He was a member of the Institute for Advanced Study from 1995 to 1997.

Ono worked at Pennsylvania State University from 1997 to 2000 as an assistant professor and then as the Louis A. Martarano Professor of Mathematics. He moved to the University of Wisconsin-Madison as an associate professor in 1999, and later became the Solle P. and Margaret Manasse Professor of Letters and Science from 2004 to 2011 and as the Hilldale Professor of Mathematics from 2008 to 2011. He was the Candler Professor of Mathematics at Emory University from 2010 to 2019. In 2019, Ono became the Thomas Jefferson Professor of Mathematics at the University of Virginia, and in Fall 2021 he was named the Marvin Rosenblum Professor of Mathematics and the chairman of the Department of Mathematics. He ended his term as chairman in Fall 2022 to become the STEM Advisor to the Provost at the University of Virginia.

Ono was the Vice President of the American Mathematical Society from 2018 to 2021. He is serving as the section chair for mathematics at the American Association for the Advancement of Science from 2020 to 2023.

Research

Integer partitions 
In 2000, Ono derived a theory of Ramanujan congruences for the partition function with all prime moduli greater than 3. His paper was published in the Annals of Mathematics.

In a joint work with Jan Bruinier, Ono discovered a finite algebraic formula for computing partition numbers.

A framework for the Rogers–Ramanujan identities
In 2014, a joint paper by Michael J. Griffin, Ono, and S. Ole Warnaar provided a framework for the Rogers–Ramanujan identities and their arithmetic properties, solving a long-standing mystery stemming from the work of Ramanujan. The findings yield new formulas for algebraic numbers. Their work was ranked 15th among the top 100 stories of 2014 in science by Discover magazine.

Proof of the umbral moonshine conjecture
In a joint paper co-authored with John Duncan and Michael Griffin, Ono helped prove the umbral moonshine conjecture. This conjecture was formulated by Miranda Cheng, John Duncan, and Jeff Harvey, and is a generalization of the monstrous moonshine conjecture proved by Richard Borcherds.

Work on the Riemann Hypothesis
In May 2019, Ono published a joint paper (co-authored with Don Zagier and two former students) in the Proceedings of the National Academy of Sciences on the Riemann Hypothesis. Their work proves a large portion of the Jensen-Polya criterion for the Riemann Hypothesis. However, the Riemann Hypothesis remains unsolved. Their work also establishes the Gaussian Unitary Ensemble random matrix condition in derivative aspect for the derivatives of the Riemann Xi function.

Advising National Champion and Olympic Swimmers
Since 2016, Ono has been using mathematical analysis and modeling to advise elite competitive swimmers including 2020 Tokyo Olympic medalists Kate Douglass, Cate DeLoof, Paige Madden, Alex Walsh, Emma Weyant and Andrew Wilson.

Media work
He was an Associate Producer and the mathematical consultant for the movie The Man Who Knew Infinity, which starred Jeremy Irons and Dev Patel, based on Ramanujan's biography written by Robert Kanigel.

He featured in a 2022 Super Bowl commercial for Miller Lite beer. He is on the Board of Directors of the Infinity Arts Foundation.

Personal life
From 2012 to 2014, Ono has competed in World Triathlon Cross Championships events while representing the United States.

Honors and awards

 National Security Agency Young Investigator (1997)
 National Science Foundation CAREER Award  (1998)
 Sloan Research Fellowship (1999)
 Packard Fellowship for Science and Engineering (1999)
 Presidential Early Career Award for Scientists and Engineers from President Bill Clinton (2000)
 Guggenheim Fellowship (2003)
 National Science Foundation Director's Distinguished Teaching Scholar Award (2005)
 Fellow of the American Mathematical Society (2013)
 University of Chicago Alumni Award for Professional Achievement (2023)

Editorial boards
Ono is on the editorial board of several journals:
 Annals of Combinatorics
 Bulletin of the American Mathematical Society
 Communications in Number Theory and Physics
 Electronic Journal of Combinatorics
 Integers
 International Journal of Modern Mathematics
 International Journal of Number Theory
 Involve, a Journal of Mathematics
 Journal of Combinatorics and Number Theory
 The Ramanujan Journal
 Research in the Mathematical Sciences (Editor-in-Chief)
 Research in Number Theory (Editor-in-Chief)

See also
Ramanujan's ternary quadratic form

References

External links
 
 
 
 Ken Ono on The Man Who Knew Infinity and why Ramanujan Matters
 

1968 births
Living people
Combinatorialists
Number theorists
20th-century American mathematicians
21st-century American mathematicians
Towson High School alumni
University of Chicago alumni
Emory University faculty
University of Virginia faculty
University of Wisconsin–Madison faculty
American people of Japanese descent
Fellows of the American Mathematical Society
Mathematicians from Philadelphia